Yero Bello (born 11 December 1987) is a Nigerian former professional footballer who played as a striker.

Career

FC Vaslui 

On 9 August 2010, Bello signed with the Romanian club FC Vaslui for three years.

Statistics 

Statistics accurate as of match played 16 May 2012

References

External links

1987 births
Living people
Nigerian footballers
Maccabi Haifa F.C. players
Hapoel Nof HaGalil F.C. players
Hapoel Ironi Kiryat Shmona F.C. players
Hapoel Haifa F.C. players
FC Vaslui players
Bnei Sakhnin F.C. players
F.C. Ashdod players
FC Milsami Orhei players
Nigerian expatriate footballers
Expatriate footballers in Israel
Nigerian expatriate sportspeople in Israel
Expatriate footballers in Romania
Nigerian expatriate sportspeople in Romania
Expatriate footballers in Moldova
Nigerian expatriate sportspeople in Moldova
Israeli Premier League players
Liga I players
Sportspeople from Kaduna
Association football forwards
Association football wingers